Carla Scicluna (born 27 January 2001) is a Maltese sprinter. She competed at the 2020 Summer Olympics, in Women's 100 m.

Biography
Carla Scicluna was born on 27 January 2001. She won gold medals in the 100 m and 4x100 Metres Relay at the Malta national championships in 2020. She was a 200 m semi-finalist at the European Youth Olympic Festival in 2017, and placed fourth in the 200m at the 2021 Championships of the Small States of Europe.

Scicluna qualified for the 100m at the 2020 Summer Olympics, through a universality place.

She is studying medicine.

References

External links
 

2001 births
Living people
Maltese female sprinters
Olympic athletes of Malta
Athletes (track and field) at the 2020 Summer Olympics
Olympic female sprinters
Athletes (track and field) at the 2022 Commonwealth Games